Joél Curbelo (born 4 July 1974) is a Puerto Rican basketball player. He competed in the men's tournament at the 1996 Summer Olympics. His son, Andre Curbelo is a basketball player for the St. John's Red Storm.

References

External links
 

1974 births
Living people
Basketball players at the 1996 Summer Olympics
People from Río Piedras, Puerto Rico
Puerto Rican men's basketball players
Olympic basketball players of Puerto Rico